Ferdinand Bernabela is a Bonaire professional football manager. From 2014 to 2015 he coached the Bonaire national football team.

Managerial statistics

References

External links
 
 Profile at Soccerpunter.com
 Bonaire - Caribbean Football 

Year of birth missing (living people)
Living people
Bonaire football managers
Bonaire national football team managers
Place of birth missing (living people)